The following is a list of baseball players from Cuba who have played in Major League Baseball.

A 

 José Abreu
 José Acosta
 Merito Acosta
 Rafael Almeida
 Luis (Witto) Aloma
 Yonder Alonso
 Dariel Álvarez
 Ossie Álvarez
 Yordan Álvarez
 Rogelio Álvarez
 Vicente Amor
 Sandy Amorós
 Ángel Aragón
 Jack Aragón
 Rudy Árias
 René Arocha
 Rolando Arrojo
 Erisbel Arruebarruena
 José Joaquín (Joe) Ázcue

B

 Danys Báez
 Ed Bauta
 Julio Bécquer
 Esteban (Steve) Bellán (*)
Yuniesky Betancourt
Francisley Bueno

C

 Jack Calvo
 Bert Campaneris
 Frank Campos
Bárbaro Cañizares
 José Canseco
 Ozzie Canseco
 José Cardenal
 Leo Cárdenas
 Paul Casanova
 Alberto Castillo
Rusney Castillo
Yoenis Céspedes
Aroldis Chapman
 Jorge Comellas
 Gerardo Concepción
 Sandalio (Sandy) Consuegra
José Contreras
 Mike Cuellar
 Bert Cueto
 Manuel (Potato) Cueto

D

 Tommy de la Cruz
 Mike de la Hoz
 Juan Delis
Odrisamer Despaigne
 Orestes Destrade
Aledmys Díaz
 Juan Díaz
Yandy Díaz
 Pedro Dibut
 Lino Donoso

E

Roenis Elias
Yunel Escobar
 Bobby Estalella, Sr.
 Oscar Estrada

F

 Humberto (Chico) Fernández
 José Fernández
 Lorenzo (Chico) Fernández
 Osvaldo Fernández
 Ángel Fleitas
 Mike Fornieles
 Tony Fossas
 Tito Fuentes

G

 Bárbaro Garbey
Adonis Garcia
Onelki Garcia
 Ramón García
 Carlos Gómez
 Vince Gonzales
 Eusebio González
 Julio González
Miguel González
 Mike González
 Tony González
Yasmani Grandal
 Fermín (Mike) Guerra
Alex Guerrero
Lourdes Gurriel Jr.
Yuli Gurriel

H

 Adeiny Hechavarria
 Guillermo Heredia
 Adrián Hernández
 Evelio Hernández
 Jackie Hernández
 Liván Hernández
 Michel Hernández
 Orlando Hernández
 Salvador (Chico) Hernández
 Mike Herrera
 Pancho Herrera
 Yoslan Herrera
 Dalier Hinojosa

I

José Iglesias
Raisel Iglesias
 Enrique (Hank) Izquierdo
 Hansel Izquierdo

L

 George Lauzerique
Raudel Lazo
 Isidoro (Izzy) León
 Marcelino López
 Ramón López
 Adolfo (Dolf) Luque

M

 Héctor Maestri
 Conrado (Connie) Marrero
 Eli Marrero
 Armando Marsans
Leonys Martín
 Héctor Martínez
 José Martínez
 Marty Martínez
 Rogelio Martínez
 Gabriel (Tony) Martínez
Yunesky Maya
 Orlando McFarlane
 Román Mejías
 Minervino (Minnie) Mendoza
 Antonio (Tony) Menéndez
 Orestes (Minnie) Miñoso
Ariel Miranda
Juan Miranda
 Willy Miranda
Yoan Moncada
 Aurelio Monteagudo
 René Monteagudo
 Manny Montejo
Kendrys Morales
 Daniel (Danny) Morejón
 Julio Moreno

N

Adrian Nieto
 Lázaro (Cholly) Naranjo
 Ray Noble
 Vladimir Núñez

O

 Tony Oliva
Héctor Olivera
 Tony (Mosquito) Ordeñana
 Rey Ordóñez
 Eddie Oropesa
 Bill Ortega
 Oliverio (Baby) Ortiz 

 Roberto Ortiz
 Regino (Reggie) Otero

P

 Rafael Palmeiro
 Emilio Palmero
 Camilo Pascual
 Carlos (Patato) Pascual
 Carlos Paula
 Carlos (Chick) Pedroes
Brayan Peña
 Orlando Peña
 Tony Pérez
 Leo Posada
 Ariel Prieto
Yasiel Puig

R

Alexei Ramírez
 Pedro Ramos
 Roberto (Bobby) Ramos
 Napoleón (Nap) Reyes
Luis Robert
 Armando Roche
Eddy Rodríguez
 Freddy Rodríguez
 Héctor Rodríguez
 José Rodríguez
 Octavio (Cookie) Rojas
 Minervino (Minnie) Rojas
 Chico Ruiz

S

 Alex Sánchez
 Israel Sánchez
 Raúl Sánchez
 Amauri Sanit
 Nelson Santovenia
 Diego Seguí
 Alay Soler
Jorge Soler
 Luis Suárez
 Leo Sutherland

T

 José Tartabull
 Tony Taylor
 Michael Tejera
 Luis Tiant
 Jorge Toca
Yasmany Tomas
 Gil Torres
 Ricardo Torres
 Oscar Tuero

U

 Santiago (Sandy) Ullrich
Henry Urrutia

V

Raúl Valdés
 Rogelio (Roy) Valdés
 Hilario (Sandy) Valdespino
 René Valdez
 José Valdivielso
 Zoilo Versalles
Dayán Viciedo

Z

 Adrián Zabala
 Oscar Zamora
 José Zardón

* In 1871, Bellán became the first Latin American professional baseball player to play in the United States

See also
List of baseball players who defected from Cuba

References
Players Born in Cuba Republic Baseball-Reference.com

Baseball, Major League
Cuba